Sumpter Mills Clarke (October 18, 1897 – March 16, 1962) was a Major League Baseball outfielder for the Chicago Cubs and the Cleveland Indians from 1920 to 1924.

Clarke was suspended from playing baseball in August 1921; he got into a fight with the manager of the Birmingham minor league team on August 29, 1921 over a missed ground ball. While fellow Birmingham player Pie Traynor was called up to Bigs to help Pittsburgh with their run for the National League pennant, Clarke would sit out the remainder of the season.

References

External links

1897 births
1962 deaths
Chicago Cubs players
Cleveland Indians players
Major League Baseball outfielders
The Citadel Bulldogs baseball players
Baseball players from Savannah, Georgia
Minor league baseball managers
Baltimore Orioles (IL) players
Brantford Red Sox players
Birmingham Barons players
New Orleans Pelicans (baseball) players
Atlanta Crackers players
Albany Nuts players
Springfield Buckeyes players
Springfield Chicks players